Taylor Montgomery Mason (born September 8, 1967) is an American politician from Virginia. A member of the Democratic Party, Mason is the member of the Virginia Senate for the 1st district.

Early life
Mason was born in Farmville, Virginia. He attended the College of William & Mary, and graduated in 1989 with a degree in government. Mason works for Visa Inc. as a senior director, specializing on fraud prevention and risk management.

Political career
Mason ran for the 93rd district of the Virginia House of Delegates in the 2013 elections. He defeated incumbent Republican Michael B. Watson.

Following the death of Sen. John Miller, Mason ran and won as the Virginia State Senator for District 1 in 2016. For the 2018 legislative session, Senator Mason sat on three committees: General Laws & Technology; Rehabilitation & Social Services; and, Agriculture, Conservation, & Natural Resources.

Electoral History

Personal life
Mason is a resident of Williamsburg, Virginia.

References

External links
 

Living people
Democratic Party Virginia state senators
Democratic Party members of the Virginia House of Delegates
People from Farmville, Virginia
Politicians from Williamsburg, Virginia
College of William & Mary alumni
Place of birth missing (living people)
1967 births
21st-century American politicians